Air Aruba  was the main air carrier from the island of Aruba. It was founded in 1986 and it declared bankruptcy in 2000. It was headquartered in the Brown Invest Building in Oranjestad, Aruba.

History

Air Aruba began in September 1986 as a ground handling agent for most airlines in Aruba. Two years after being founded, on August 18 to be exact, Air Aruba (with the help of KLM & later Air Holland) carried out its first commercial flight with YS-11 turbo-prop type aircraft operating between the "ABC" islands of Aruba, Bonaire, and Curaçao, as well as Caracas, Venezuela.
Over the years Air Aruba expanded its schedule to various destinations in the Caribbean (Santo Domingo, Dominican Republic and St. Maarten), North America (Newark, Miami) and South America (São Paulo, Maracaibo, Las Piedras). Air Aruba also started flying across the Atlantic to Amsterdam and Cologne. This flight was initially operated in conjunction with Air Holland but was later assumed completely by Air Aruba. Subsequently, the fleet was also upgraded, shifting more from turbo-prop type aircraft to jet type aircraft, including the Boeing 727, 737, 757, and 767. On the ground, Air Aruba also kept developing, forming a new ground handling company as a subsidiary in joint ownership with Ogden Aviation Services. Air Aruba also expanded its reservations office in North America coping with the demand.

Carrying on the tradition of the Aruban people, Air Aruba strove to bring the friendliness of Aruba to the airline industry; however, financial problems made the Government of Aruba seek a new owner for the airline. On October 27, 1998, Air Aruba secured a takeover by the Venezuelan airline Aserca Airlines, which became the majority owner of Air Aruba. In December 1998, Air Aruba leased two brand new MD-90s, expanding the total fleet to 5 aircraft. At the same time, Air Aruba also inaugurated a route to Philadelphia and re-opened a route to Baltimore, making the total number of destinations to 10. In the competitive airline industry, it is important to have stable partnerships with other respected international airlines. Air Aruba had done so by developing fruitful partnerships with, among others, Continental Airlines and KLM. In March 1999, Air Aruba had established a far going agreement with Aserca Airlines and Air ALM to provide a better service in the Caribbean and South America for both its customers and its employees. The rising cost of operations and management caused Air Aruba to file bankruptcy in 2000. Air Aruba suspended its operations as of October 23, 2000.

Destinations

Caribbean
 (Hub)
Oranjestad (Queen Beatrix International Airport)

Santo Domingo (Las Américas International Airport)

Kralendijk (Flamingo International Airport)
Willemstad (Hato International Airport)
Philipsburg (Princess Juliana International Airport)

Europe

Cologne (Cologne Bonn Airport)

Amsterdam (Amsterdam Schiphol Airport)

North America (United States)

Miami (Miami International Airport)
Orlando (Orlando International Airport)
Tampa (Tampa International Airport)

Newark (Newark Liberty International Airport)

Philadelphia (Philadelphia International Airport)

Houston (George Bush Intercontinental Airport)

Baltimore (Baltimore/Washington International Thurgood Marshall Airport)

South America

São Paulo (São Paulo/Guarulhos International Airport)
Manaus (Eduardo Gomes International Airport)

Barranquilla (Ernesto Cortissoz International Airport)
Bogotá (El Dorado International Airport)
Cali (Alfonso Bonilla Aragón International Airport)
Medellín (José María Córdova International Airport)

Barcelona (Generál José Antonio Anzoátegui International Airport)
Caracas (Simón Bolívar International Airport)
Coro (José Leonardo Chirinos Airport)
Isla de Margarita (Del Caribe International Airport)
Las Piedras (Josefa Camejo International Airport)
Maracaibo (La Chinita International Airport)
Valencia (Arturo Michelena International Airport)

Fleet history

Air Aruba's NAMC YS-11s were the first acquired aircraft to be introduced into their fleet. After some time, Air Aruba initially replaced them with an Embraer EMB-120. Later on, they acquired a Boeing 757-200 (to fly to Miami). Furthermore, the fleet size expanded by introducing aircraft from Boeing with the latter aircraft type operating flights to Europe as well as some U.S. routes. In the last operating years of Air Aruba, only the Douglas DC-9, MD-80 and MD-90 were operated by Air Aruba until the airline closed its doors.

Air Aruba's fleet consisted of the following aircraft:

See also
List of defunct airlines of the Netherlands Antilles

References

External links

Air Aruba (Archive)
Air Aruba former jet fleet detail

Defunct airlines of Aruba
Airlines established in 1986
Airlines disestablished in 2000
Defunct airlines of the Netherlands Antilles
1986 establishments in Aruba
2000 disestablishments in Aruba